Frank Blunstone (born 17 October 1934) is an English former footballer who played as an outside left for Crewe Alexandra, Chelsea and the England national team.

Playing career
After surprisingly rejecting Wolverhampton Wanderers in favour of his home-town club, he signed professional terms with Crewe in early 1952. Following a string of impressive performances in Division Three North, he was signed by Chelsea manager Ted Drake for £7,500 a year later while still doing national service.

He made his Chelsea debut in a 3–2 victory over Tottenham Hotspur, at White Hart Lane in February 1953, scoring the decisive third goal. His early years at the club saw little success for the team, but in 1954–55 Chelsea became First Division champions, with Blunstone an important part of the side, though he continued to juggle appearances for Chelsea with his national service.

Between 1954 and 1956, Blunstone was capped on five occasions by England under-23's, scoring three goals, and also won five caps for the senior England team. He made his debut against Wales, creating two goals for teammate Roy Bentley in a 3–2 win. He also played in England's famous 7–2 win over Scotland at Wembley. He also won two caps for the Football League XI. Blunstone retired from playing in 1964 aged only 30, having made 347 appearances for Chelsea and scored 54 goals

Managerial career
Blunstone immediately joined the Chelsea coaching staff. He was later appointed Brentford manager in 1969 and led the team to the 5th round of the FA Cup in 1971 and promotion to the Third Division a year later. In 1973, after a disagreement with the Brentford chairman, he joined Manchester United which reunited him with his old boss at Chelsea, Tommy Docherty. Blunstone officially became assistant manager at United in 1976 after the departure of Paddy Crerand, but he had been that in all but name since his arrival at Manchester United. Blunstone was also heavily involved in the reserve team at United, working alongside reserve team managers, Bill Foulkes from 1973 to 1974, and then alongside Foulkes' successor, Jack Crompton, from 1974 to 1977. Blunstone later had brief spells as assistant manager of Derby County and manager of Greek clubs Ethnikos and Aris.

Personal life
As of 2005, Blunstone was living in Weston, near Crewe. As of 2022, Blunstone is the earliest-surviving England senior international.

References

External links
 

1934 births
Living people
English footballers
Association football wingers
English Football League players
England international footballers
England under-23 international footballers
Chelsea F.C. players
Crewe Alexandra F.C. players
English football managers
Brentford F.C. managers
Derby County F.C. non-playing staff
Ethnikos Piraeus F.C. managers
Aris Thessaloniki F.C. managers
Chelsea F.C. non-playing staff
Manchester United F.C. non-playing staff
English Football League representative players
English expatriate football managers
Expatriate football managers in Greece
English expatriate sportspeople in Greece
Super League Greece managers